Mohammad Kamrul Islam (born 31 July 1986, in Dhaka), generally known as "Imon", is a Bangladeshi first-class and List A cricketer. He is a right-handed batsman and a right-arm off break bowler. He made his debut for Dhaka Division in the 2005–06 season. He has represented his country in under-19 one day international matches.

References

External links
 

1986 births
Bangladeshi cricketers
Dhaka Division cricketers
Barisal Division cricketers
Sylhet Division cricketers
Living people
Bangladesh A cricketers